St. Patrick's Roman Catholic Church is a historic church on Oak Avenue, on Higgins Hill in Bisbee, Arizona, United States. It was built in 1915 and added to the National Register of Historic Places in 1995.

It was designed by architect Albert C. Martin of Los Angeles.

It was deemed significant "because it embodies distinct characteristics of the Late Gothic Revival period of architecture and high artistic value in its decorative fittings, most specifically the stained glass windows and alters."

It is a contributing building in the Bisbee Historic District.

It is located about 200 feet up Higgins Hill, on the southerly side of Tombstone Canyon.

References

Buildings and structures in Cochise County, Arizona
Gothic Revival church buildings in Arizona
Churches on the National Register of Historic Places in Arizona
Roman Catholic churches completed in 1915
Roman Catholic churches in Arizona
Catholic Church in Arizona
1915 establishments in Arizona
National Register of Historic Places in Cochise County, Arizona
Bisbee, Arizona
20th-century Roman Catholic church buildings in the United States